Hoobastank is the debut studio album by American rock band Hoobastank, released on November 20, 2001, by Island Records. Three singles were released from the album: "Crawling in the Dark", "Remember Me", and "Running Away". It has since been certified Platinum in the United States.

Track listing

Personnel
Hoobastank
Doug Robb – lead vocals, rhythm guitar on “Too Little Too Late”
Dan Estrin – lead guitar
Markku Lappalainen – bass
Chris Hesse – drums

Production
Jim Wirt – producer, engineer
CJ Eiriksson, Dave Holdredge, Matt Marrin – assistant engineers
Jay Baumgardner – mixing
James Murray, Mark Kiczula – mixing assistants

Artwork
Louis Marino – art direction, design
Ray Lego – photography
Rick Patrick – creative director

Management
Paul Pontius – A&R

Charts

Weekly charts

Year-end charts

Certifications

References

Hoobastank albums
2001 debut albums
Island Records albums